William Tarlton "Todd" Turner is a former athletic director of the University of Washington.

Early life and education
Turner was born and raised in Raleigh, North Carolina and graduated from University of North Carolina at Chapel Hill and Ohio University.

Career
Upon graduating from Ohio University, Turner accepted a position as Athletic Ticket Manager at the University of Virginia where he worked for 11 years in various roles before accepting an athletic director (AD) position at the University of Connecticut from 1987 to 1990. He left the institution in 1990 to accept a similar position at N.C. State. He remained at N.C. State until 1996. He served as AD at Vanderbilt University from 1997 until 2003.  Turner became AD at the University of Washington in July, 2004 and resigned from his AD position at the University of Washington in 2008 after three-and-a-half-years. After a brief stint with collegiate sports multi-media rights company, International Sports Properties (ISP), in 2010 Turner founded Collegiate Sports Associates, a leading consulting and executive search firm serving intercollegiate athletics. He is also co-founder with his son Drew Turner of Collegiate Sports Connect an online platform used by universities to identify and hire collegiate athletics administrators.

Personal life
Turner and his wife Sara Newbold, who is also from Raleigh, have four children together.

References

External links

Living people
People from Raleigh, North Carolina
Washington Huskies athletic directors
NC State Wolfpack athletic directors
North Carolina State University alumni
Ohio State University alumni
Year of birth missing (living people)